Jörgen Wrønding Andersen (sometimes listed as Jørgen Andersen, born November 5, 1941) is a Danish sprint canoeist who competed from the 1960s to the early 1970s. He won a bronze medal in the K-1 10000 m event at the 1973 ICF Canoe Sprint World Championships in Tampere.

Andersen also competed in two Summer Olympics, earning his best finish of ninth in the K-4 1000 m event at Mexico City in 1968.

References

Sports-reference.com profile

1941 births
Canoeists at the 1968 Summer Olympics
Canoeists at the 1972 Summer Olympics
Danish male canoeists
Living people
Olympic canoeists of Denmark
ICF Canoe Sprint World Championships medalists in kayak